Smart Politics (RP) is an inter-factional parliamentary group in the Verkhovna Rada (the national parliament of Ukraine), created by former parliamentary speaker Dmytro Razumkov on 8 November 2021. The group currently includes 25 deputies, 19 from Servant of the People, two from Batkivshchyna and four independents.

History
Dmytro Razumkov is a former leader of Ukrainian President Volodymyr Zelensky's Servant of the People party. In the 2019 Ukrainian parliamentary election, Razumkov headed the party list of Servant of the People. In the election the party won 124 seats on the nationwide party list and 130 constituency seats.

On 29 August 2019, Razumkov was elected Chairman of the Verkhovna Rada (Ukraine's national parliament).

On 7 October 2021, the Verkhovna Rada voted to dismiss Razumkov from his post as Chairman of the Parliament. Four days earlier President Zelensky had stated that he was "not a member of our team anymore."

On 8 November 2021, Razumkov founded the inter-factional parliamentary group Smart Politics. The group included 25 deputies, 19 from Servant of the People, two from Batkivshchyna and four independents.

On 16 November 2021, Razumkov confirmed that he would create a political party.

In January 2022, Razumkov founded an NGO called Team Razumkov that would form the backbone of the new party. Also in January 2022, Mukachevo mayor Andriy Baloha joined this project.

References

2021 establishments in Ukraine
Political parties established in 2022
Parliamentary factions in Ukraine
Parliamentary groups in Ukraine